Mindee Ong (born 7 October 1979) is a Singaporean actress best known for starring in the Royston Tan films 881 and 12 Lotus, as well as in the television series Let It Go.

Career
Ong starred in Royston Tan films 881 and 12 Lotus. She then starred in the 2010 comedy film Lelio Popo, the 2011 romantic comedy film Perfect Rivals and the television series Anything Goes. She starred in the 2014 Malaysian horror film The Transcend.

She starred in the television series Let It Go in 2015. In the same year, she starred in My Papa Rich. She appeared in the second season of Folklore.

Personal life
She has two daughters.

Filmography

Film
Birthday (2005; short film)
881 (2007)
12 Lotus (2008)
Lelio Popo (2010)
Perfect Rivals (2011)
Filial Party (2014)
Seventh (2014)
The Transcend (2014)
My Papa Rich (2015)
The Dream Boyz (2015)
Will You Be My Valentine? (2016; short film)

Television
Let It Go (2015)
The Pupil 2 (2011)
Folklore (2021)

References

Living people
Singaporean film actresses
Singaporean television actresses
1979 births